Stephano Barberis (born Stephen Barberis in Kitimat, British Columbia) is a Canadian music video director. By Autumn of 2022, Barberis has received 45 'Director Of The Year' and 'Video Of The Year' Awards, including a Leo Award, 21 consecutive BCCMAs, 12 CCMAs, and two CMAO in addition to over 100 'Director Of The Year' and 'Video Of The Year' nominations, including two MuchMusic MMVA’s.  Stephano Barberis has directed over 200 music videos which include 21 official number one hits worldwide and over 60 official top 20 videos.

Barberis also creates electronic music.

Music Video Awards & Nominations From The Following Organizations 

 Canadian Country Music Association CCMA
 British Columbia Country Music Association BCCMA
 Western Canadian Music Award WCMA
 MuchMusic Video Awards MMVA
 Leo Awards LEO
 Alberta Recording Industries Association ARIA
 Saskatchewan Country Music Association SCMA
 Aboriginal Peoples Choice Awards APCA
 Canadian Aboriginal Music Awards CAMA
 Country Music Association Of Ontario CMAO

See also
Music videos directed by Stephano Barberis

References

External links 
Official Site

British Columbia Institute of Technology alumni
Canadian music video directors
Canadian people of Greek descent
Living people
People from Kitimat
Year of birth missing (living people)